Events in the year 2003 in Gabon.

Incumbents 

 President: Omar Bongo Ondimba
 Prime Minister: Jean-François Ntoutoume Emane

Events 

 The country competed in the 2003 All-Africa Games held at the National Stadium in the city of Abuja, Nigeria.

Deaths

References 

 
2000s in Gabon
Years of the 21st century in Gabon
Gabon